Jong Yeu-Jeng (born December 25, 1973) is a Taiwanese baseball player who competed in the 1992 Summer Olympics.

He was part of the Chinese Taipei baseball team which won the silver medal. He is a right-handed pitcher.

External links
profile

1973 births
Living people
Baseball players at the 1992 Summer Olympics
Olympic baseball players of Taiwan
Baseball players from Tainan
Olympic silver medalists for Taiwan
Olympic medalists in baseball

Medalists at the 1992 Summer Olympics
20th-century Taiwanese people